In geometry, the gyroelongated square cupola is one of the Johnson solids (J23). As the name suggests, it can be constructed by gyroelongating a square cupola (J4) by attaching an octagonal antiprism to its base. It can also be seen as a gyroelongated square bicupola (J45) with one square bicupola removed.

Dual polyhedron 

The dual of the gyroelongated square cupola has 20 faces: 8 kites, 4 rhombi, and 8 pentagons.

External links
 

Johnson solids